The 2002 World Judo Juniors Championships was an edition of the World Judo Juniors Championships, organised by the International Judo Federation. It was held in Jeju Island, South Korea, from 12 to 15 September 2002.

Medal summary

Men's events

Women's events

Source Results

Medal table

References

External links
 

World Judo Junior Championships
World Championships, U21
Judo competitions in South Korea
Judo
Judo, World Championships U21